Extraordinary rendition is a type of state-sponsored extraterritorial abduction.

Extraordinary Rendition may also refer to:
Extraordinary Rendition (film), a 2007 drama film
Extraordinary Rendition (album), a 2008 album recorded by Rupa & the April Fishes

See also
Extraordinary Rendition Band, a protest band in Rhode Island, United States